Too Bad to Be True, or TBTBT, was a Canadian hip hop group, based in Toronto, Ontario, active in the 1990s. They were best known for their 1993 album One Track Mind, which won the Juno Award for Rap Recording of the Year at the 1994 Juno Awards. The group consisted of teenagers Jeromy "Lyric J" Robinson, Shaka "DJ Shaka" Dodd, Al "Al C" Cox, and Frankie "MC Styles" Scarcelli.

History
TBTBT began writing and recording raps in 1992 when they were still in school. They took part in Toronto's annual Stay Clear anti-drug campaign pop contest. In 1993 the trio released the album One Track Mind on ISBA Records in Canada and Cold Chillin’/Warner Bros. Records internationally.

The group received significant video airplay on MuchMusic for the album's title track, but consistent with the commercial struggles faced by Canadian hip hop at the time, received almost no commercial radio airplay in Canada outside of the Toronto, Vancouver, and Montreal markets.

In 1994 the group released a second single, "Get Down to It", from their album. The track appeared on the RPM Canadian Content chart for six weeks in April and May that year.

Legacy
Both of TBTBT member Jeromy Robison's sons have pursued a career in rap under the stage names of Casper TNG and K Money.

Discography

Album
One Track Mind (1993)

Singles
"One Track Mind"
"Get Down To It"

References

Black Canadian musical groups
Canadian hip hop groups
Canadian boy bands
Child musical groups
Musical groups from Toronto
Juno Award for Rap Recording of the Year winners
Cold Chillin' Records artists
Musical groups established in 1990
Musical groups disestablished in 1995
1990 establishments in Ontario
1995 disestablishments in Ontario